"Jimmy's Got a Girlfriend" is a song recorded by Canadian country music group The Wilkinsons. It was released in January 2000 as the lead single from their album Here and Now. The song reached number 11 on the Canadian RPM Country Tracks chart and number 34 on the U.S. Billboard Hot Country Singles & Tracks chart. It was written by Ron Harbin, Anthony L. Smith, and Lonestar lead singer Richie McDonald. It was named Single of the Year at the 2000 Canadian Country Music Association Awards and was nominated at the 2001 Grammy Awards for Best Country Performance by a Duo or Group with Vocal.

Music video
The music video was directed by Jim Shea and premiered in early 2000.

Chart performance

References

2000 singles
The Wilkinsons songs
Songs written by Richie McDonald
Giant Records (Warner) singles
Song recordings produced by Doug Johnson (record producer)
Songs written by Anthony L. Smith
Songs written by Ron Harbin
2000 songs